Air Headquarters Levant (AHQ Levant) was a command of the British Royal Air Force (RAF) established on 1 December 1941, by renaming the command known as H.Q. RAF Palestine and Transjordan. It controlled RAF units in the Mandate of Palestine and in the Emirate of Transjordan. Prior to being disbanded on 27 July 1948, Air H.Q. Levant was a sub-command of RAF Middle East Command and its successors. RAF Middle East Command became a sub-command of the Mediterranean Air Command in February 1943.

An AHQ Levant was reformed on 1 May 1955 when AHQ Iraq was renamed AHQ Levant as an interim measure following a new agreement with the Iraq Government for the defence of Iraq and use by the RAF of bases in Iraq. On 1 December 1955 AHQ Levant started to transfer from RAF Habbaniya to Cyprus (probably RAF Nicosia) and on 15 January 1956, when the move was complete, AHQ Cyprus and AHQ Levant were amalgamated as AHQ Levant. AHQ Levant was disbanded, 1 Apr 1958.

Orders of battle (1941-1945)

H.Q RAF Palestine and Transjordan 11 November 1941
Air Commodore Leslie Brown
No. 259 Wing
No. 263 Wing

Air H.Q. Levant 27 October 1942
Group Capt Herbert Mermagen
No. 1438 Flight, Bristol Blenheims
No. 1413 Flight (Met.), Gloster Gladiators
No. 2 Photographic Reconnaissance Unit RAF (Detachment), Hawker Hurricanes
No. 213 Group
No. 241 Wing
No. 451 Squadron RAAF, Hurricane

Air H.Q. Levant 10 July 1943
A/Cdre Bernard McEntegart
No. 208 Squadron, Hurricane
No. 1413 Flight (Meteorological), Gladiator

Air H.Q. Levant June, 1944
Air Commodore John Coleman

Air H.Q. Levant January, 1945
Air Commodore Hector McGregor (RNZAF)

Reformation of Air H.Q. Levant 1 May 1955

1 May 1955 - April 1956, on renaming of A.H.Q. Iraq, A.V.M. Hugh Hamilton Brookes

Met.= Meteorological 
Det.=Detachment;RAAF=Royal Australian Air Force.

References

Citations

Bibliography
David Lee, Flight from the Middle East: A history of the Royal Air Force in the Arabian Peninsula and adjacent territories 1945-1972, HMSO 1980

Royal Air Force overseas commands
Military units and formations of the Royal Air Force in World War II
Military units and formations established in 1941
Military units and formations disestablished in 1958
Military units and formations in Mandatory Palestine in World War II